Peridroma chilenaria is a moth of the family Noctuidae. It is found in Termas de Río Blanco  in Chile.

The wingspan is 36–40 mm. Adults are on wing from January to March.

External links
 Noctuinae of Chile

Noctuinae
Moths described in 1984
Endemic fauna of Chile